Theodore Lyman II (September 20, 1792 – July 18, 1849) was an American philanthropist, politician, and author, born in Boston, the son of Theodore Lyman and Lydia Pickering Williams.  He graduated from Harvard in 1810, visited Europe (1812–14), studied law, and with Edward Everett, revisited Europe in 1817–19.  From 1819 to 1822 he was an aide to John Brooks, the Governor of Massachusetts. He became brigadier general of militia in 1823, and from 1820 to 1825 he served in the State Legislature,

Mayor of Boston
In 1833 Lyman defeated William Sullivan, the Whig candidate, and was elected the first Democratic Mayor of Boston.  He served for two years from January 1834 through January 1836.  Lyman was such a popular mayor that when he ran for reelection he was nominated by the Whigs.

Views on Slavery and Equality
As Mayor of Boston, Lyman had to keep the peace between radical abolitionists, and industrialists who feared anti-slavery agitators would cause southern plantation owners to cut ties with the northern mills and merchants. In August 1835 he presided over an anti-abolition meeting in Boston [citation??] and then, a few weeks later, during an anti-Abolitionist riot, he rescued William Lloyd Garrison from the mob and confined him to jail to save his life.

He was a liberal benefactor of the Massachusetts Horticultural Society and of the Farm School and was the founder of the State Reform School for Boys, a reform school in Westborough to which he gave $72,000.

Writings
 Three Weeks in Paris (1814)
 The Political State of Italy (1820)
 Account of the Hartford Convention (1823); in which he defended those who were concerned in that convention as an expression of harbored hatred for both Presidents, John Adams and J.Q. Adams. (SEE Essex Junto)
 The Diplomacy of the United States with Foreign Nations (1828); a work which is still valuable for the period covered.

See also
 Timeline of Boston, 1830s

Footnotes
 

Harvard University alumni
Mayors of Boston
1792 births
1849 deaths
Writers from Boston
Members of the Massachusetts House of Representatives
19th century in Boston
19th-century American politicians
Historians from Massachusetts
19th-century American philanthropists